Scopula megalostigma is a moth of the  family Geometridae. It is found in Gabon.

References

Endemic fauna of Gabon
Moths described in 1915
megalostigma
Fauna of Gabon
Moths of Africa